Rush Sturges (born February 14, 1985) is an American professional whitewater kayaker, film maker, and musician.

Early life 
Rush Sturges grew up in Forks of Salmon, California, where his parents own and operate Otter Bar Lodge, a destination kayak school on the Salmon River. Sturges' upbringing at Otter Bar Lodge exposed him to kayaking and film making at a young age. As a young teen, Sturges filmed and edited videos of Otter Bar's week-long kayaking retreats, which he would then sell to that week's clients.

Kayaking and film making career 
Sturges began competing in freestyle kayaking when he attended Adventure Quest, a traveling kayaking high school. Sturges co-founded Young Gun Productions to document the kayaking exploits of his peers and himself through film with two other Adventure Quest students: Brooks Baldwin and Marlow Long. Each member of the production company was under 18 years old when they released their debut film, The Next Generation.

In 2003, Sturges won the Junior World Championships of freestyle kayaking in Graz, Austria. After turning 18 he has returned to represent the U.S. at the freestyle kayaking world championships twice.

Sturges is credited with having invented several freestyle moves including the pistol flip and the hail mary. The hail mary involves doing a complete front flip over a waterfall, and is one of the most cutting edge moves in freeboating.

With Young Gun Productions, Sturges produced three more successful kayaking films, then went on to create his own production company, River Roots. River Roots partnered with Tyler Bradt's production company, Revolutionary Innovations, to release Africa Revolutions Tour in 2009. The sister companies released their second joint project, Dream Result, early 2010. Sturges films, edits, produces, and stars in each of his films.

For his numerous accomplishments in whitewater kayaking Rush Sturges was named an Outdoor Idol by the Outdoor Industry Foundation and was chosen with fellow Young Gun Productions film makers as one of the 20 greatest outdoor athletes by Outside Magazine.

Filmography

Musical career 
Rush Sturges performs hip hop and freestyle rap under the stage name Adrenaline Rush. His first album was released February 16, 2010. The album title is "The Road is Gold". Songs have been featured in various kayaking movies, and he has opened for the hip hop groups Swollen Members and Subliminal Sabotage.

References

External links 
River Roots
Rev-Inn
Adrenaline Rush
Teva Bio

1985 births
Living people
American male canoeists
Kayakers
Whitewater sports people